Camille Graeser (1892–1980) was a Swiss painter and member of the circle of Zurich Concrete artists. He was born in Switzerland but grew up in Stuttgart, Germany where he became a furniture designer. He took part in major exhibitions by the association Werkbund and in 1927 was invited to create furniture for Mies van der Rohe. In 1933 he fled to Switzerland as a result of the Nazis coming to power. He then became a member of the Swiss artists’ association Allianz.

Works

Estate 
The Camille Graeser Foundation was established in 1981, and is responsible for his artistic estate.

Exhibitions 

 2020 — Camille Graeser, Museum Haus Konstruktiv
2019 — The Amory Show, Pier 94, Von Bartha
 2016 — Camille Graeser und die Musik, Kunstmuseum Stuttgart
1985 — Contrasts of Form: Geometric Abstract Art, 1910–1980, The Museum of Modern Art

Publications 

 1986 — Camille Graeser – Zeichnungen, Werkverzeichnis Band 1, Dieter Schwarz
 1990 — Camille Graeser – Druckgraphik und Multiples, Werkverzeichnis Band 2, Stefan Paradowski
 1995 — Camille Graeser – Bilder, Reliefs und Plastiken, Werkverzeichnis Band 3, Rudolf Koella

References

20th-century Swiss painters
Swiss male painters
1892 births
1980 deaths
Concrete art
20th-century Swiss male artists